The Haddon Matrix is the most commonly used paradigm in the injury prevention field.

Developed by William Haddon in 1970, the matrix looks at factors related to personal attributes, vector or agent attributes and environmental attributes; before, during and after an injury or death.  By utilizing this framework, one can then think about evaluating the relative importance of different factors and design interventions.

A typical Haddon Matrix :

Preventing injuries

(These ten items are often called "Haddon's Strategies.")
Possible ways of preventing injury during the various phases include:

Pre-event
  Prevent the existence of the agent.
 Prevent the release of the agent.
 Separate the agent from the host.
 Provide protection for the host.

Event
 Minimize the amount of agent present.
 Control the pattern of release of the agent to minimize damage.
 Control the interaction between the agent and host to minimize damage.
 Increase the resilience of the host.

Post-event
 Provide a rapid treatment response for host.
 Provide treatment and rehabilitation for the host.

References

Sources
 
 https://web.archive.org/web/20070927192751/http://www.dph.sf.ca.us/CHPP/CAM/4-PublHlthApproach/HaddonMatrix.pdf
 http://www.ibiblio.org/vincentweb/chapter6.html
 

Safety